Zhang Jun (1097–1164), style name Deyuan, was a Chinese chancellor between 1135 and 1137, military commissioner, and general of the Song dynasty. A native of Mianzhu, Sichuan, he is also known by the pseudonym Zǐyán Jūshì.

Zhang rose to hold various important civil and military posts, and was successful on several occasions in checking the incursions of the Jurchen Jin dynasty in the Jin–Song Wars, notably in 1118 and 1126. He was for war and extermination, and would hear of no compromise with these enemies of his country. In reference to his mission of defence to Shaanxi and Sichuan, Zhao Ding said of him that he had "repaired the heavens and cleansed the sun." He was appointed chancellor during the reign of Emperor Gaozong in 1135, a position he shared with Zhao Ding. In 1137 he fell a victim to the intrigues of Qin Hui, whose conciliatory policy he steadily opposed, and was sent to Yongzhou in Hunan. He was then recalled under the reign of Emperor Xiaozong, successor of Gaozong. He was ennobled as Duke. Xiaozong was supportive of Zhang's hawkish stance towards to the Jurchens. In the court of Xiaozong, his political rival was Shi Hao, his former tutor and an opponent of further wars against the Song. Afterwards he rose to the rank of Prince. He was deeply read, especially in the Classic of Changes, on which he wrote a commentary. Zhang was canonised as Zhōngyàn.

See also
Emperor Gaozong of Song
Yue Fei
Han Shizhong
Qin Hui
Zhang Jun (general)
Timeline of the Jin–Song wars

Citations

Bibliography
 (hardcover)
 (hardcover)

1097 births
1164 deaths
Generals from Sichuan
Politicians from Deyang
Song dynasty chancellors
Song dynasty generals
Song dynasty politicians from Sichuan